Marcella Michelangeli (born 28 January 1943) is an Italian former actress and singer.

Biography 
Born Marcella Gherardi  in Uscio, Genoa, she won several beauty contests at a young age, including Miss Liguria. While a student at the School of Fine Arts, she attended the drama school of the Piccolo Teatro Duse in Genoa and acted on stage with Dario Fo. In the second half of the 1960s she moved to Rome, where she briefly had a career as a pop singer, recording several singles with the stage name Marcella.

Michelangeli made her film debut in 1967, alternating art films and low profile genre works. She was also active on television, where she is probably best known for the role of Oriana Fallaci in the Giuseppe Ferrara's RAI TV-movie Panagulis Vive. After fifteen years of intense activity, she retired from showbusiness in the early 1980s. 

She has a son with the actor Lou Castel.

Filmography

References

External links 
 

Italian film actresses
Italian television actresses
Italian stage actresses
1943 births
People from the Province of Genoa
Living people